Timber Sycamore was a classified weapons supply and training program run by the United States Central Intelligence Agency (CIA) and supported by some Arab intelligence services, including Saudi intelligence. Launched in 2012 or 2013, it supplied money, weaponry and training to Syrian opposition militias of the Free Syrian Army fighting Syrian President Bashar al-Assad in the Syrian civil war. According to US officials, the program was run by the CIA's Special Activities Division and has trained thousands of rebels. President Barack Obama secretly authorized the CIA to begin arming Syria's embattled rebels in 2013. The program became public knowledge in mid-2016.

One consequence of the program has been a flood of US weapons including assault rifles, mortars and rocket-propelled grenades into the Middle East's black market. Critics saw it as ineffective and expensive, and raised concerns about diversion of weapons to jihadist groups and about Timber Sycamore-backed rebels fighting alongside the al-Nusra Front. 

In July 2017, US officials stated that Timber Sycamore would be phased out, with funds possibly redirected to fighting the Islamic State (IS), or to offering rebel forces defensive capabilities.

Creation 

CIA director David Petraeus first proposed a covert program of arming and training rebels in the summer of 2012. Initially President Obama rejected the proposal, but later agreed, partially due to lobbying by foreign leaders, including from King Abdullah II of Jordan and Israeli Prime Minister Benjamin Netanyahu.

Timber Sycamore began in late 2012 or early 2013, and was similar to other Pentagon or CIA-run weapons routing and training programs that were established in previous decades to support foreign rebel forces. Greg Miller and Adam Entous of The Washington Post stated that "The operation has served as the centerpiece of the U.S. strategy to press Syrian President Bashar al-Assad to step aside." The program's principal backers were the United States and Saudi Arabia, but it was also supported by some other regional Arab governments, and by the United Kingdom. While Saudi Arabia provides more money and weaponry, the United States leads training in military equipment. The program was based in Jordan, due to that country's proximity to the battlefields in Syria.

According to The New York Times, the program initially allowed US forces to train Syrian rebels in use of military equipment, but not to directly provide the equipment itself. A few months after its creation, it was amended to allow the CIA to both train and equip rebel forces. Saudi Arabia has provided military equipment, and covert financing of rebel forces has also been provided by Qatar, Turkey and Jordan.

Saudi Arabia, Qatar, and Turkey shipped thousands of rifles, hundreds of machine guns, and large amounts of ammunition to Syrian rebels in 2012 before the program's launch. The CIA helped arrange some of the arms purchases for the Saudis, including a large deal in Croatia in 2012. A classified US State Department cable signed by Secretary of State Hillary Clinton reported that Saudi donors were a major support for Sunni militant forces globally, and some American officials worried that rebels being supported had ties to Al Qaeda.

The existence of Timber Sycamore was revealed by The New York Times and Al Jazeera in June 2016, after Jane's Defence Weekly reported, in late 2015, that the US Federal Business Opportunities website was soliciting contracts to ship thousands of tons of weapons from Eastern Europe to Taşucu, Turkey and Aqaba, Jordan.

Scope 

Timber Sycamore was run by the Military Operations Command (MOC) in Amman and provided Kalashnikov assault rifles, mortars, rocket-propelled grenades, TOW anti-tank guided missiles, night vision goggles, pickup trucks, and other weapons to prospective Syrian rebel forces. Many of the weapons were purchased in the Balkans or other locations in Eastern Europe, and then routed to Syrian rebel forces and training camps by Jordanian security services. CIA paramilitary operatives trained Syrian rebels in use of the weaponry. According to Charles Lister at The Daily Beast there were at least 50 vetted rebel groups fighting in Syria that received weapons or training through the program after late 2012; the exact number is not known.

According to American officials, the program was highly effective, training and equipping thousands of US-backed fighters to make substantial battlefield gains. American officials stated that the program began to lose effectiveness after Russia intervened militarily in the Syrian Civil War. David Ignatius, writing in The Washington Post, remarked that while the CIA program ultimately failed in its objective of removing Assad from power, it was hardly "bootless": "The program pumped many hundreds of millions of dollars to many dozens of militia groups. One knowledgeable official estimates that the CIA-backed fighters may have killed or wounded 100,000 Syrian soldiers and their allies over the past four years."

Timber Sycamore is distinct from the Syrian Train and Equip Program, another Pentagon program established to train Syrian rebel forces to fight against the Islamic State of Iraq and the Levant (ISIL) The Pentagon made it clear their goal in Syria and Iraq was 'to fight ISIS and fight ISIS only [and] we've asked [our partner forces] to be committed to that same mission' and that they would not fight Assad's military.

US-backed rebels often fought alongside al-Qaeda's al-Nusra Front, and some of the US-supplied weapons ended up in the hands of the al-Nusra Front, which had been a major concern of the Obama administration when the program was first proposed.

The program remains classified, and many details about the program remain unknown, including the total amount of support, the range of weapons transferred, the depth of training provided, the types of US trainers involved, and the exact rebel groups being supported. However, an opinion piece in The Canberra Times noted that two thousand tons of Soviet-era weapons had been delivered to Aqaba by April 2016.

The US delivered weapons via Ramstein Air Base in Germany – possibly in breach of German laws.

Black market

Jordanian intelligence arms sales 
According to American and Jordanian officials, weapons shipped into Jordan by the CIA and Saudi Arabia were stolen by Jordanian intelligence officials in the General Intelligence Directorate and sold on the black market. 

The magnitude of the theft amounted to millions of dollars, and FBI officials state that some of the stolen weapons were later used to kill two American contractors, two Jordanians and one South African at a police training station in Jordan in the 2015 Amman shooting attack.

Arms received via Timber Sycamore have flooded Middle Eastern black markets with heavy weaponry. Jordanian officials state that Jordanian intelligence officers who stole the program's weapons used the profits to purchase luxury items, with knowledge of superior officers. The thefts were halted after months of complaints by the American and Saudi governments, the program's main backers. According to Jordanian officials, several intelligence officers were fired, but their profits were not confiscated. (In Jordan, the General Intelligence Directorate is second only to the monarchy in power and prestige.) Jordan's minister for state and media affairs Mohammad Al-Momani stated that the allegations were incorrect.

Regional trafficking and ISIL 
Prior to the Syrian Civil War, southern Syria and northern Jordan were a conduit for other smuggling operations. The advent of the war transformed the region into a center for smuggling weapons, and the more formal support provided by Timber Sycamore only intensified the scale of smuggling operations on the border. Major smuggling centers include bazaars established at Ma'an in southern Jordan, Sahab in Amman, and in the Jordan River Valley.

An investigation by journalists Phil Sands and Suha Maayeh revealed that rebels supplied with weapons from the Amman MOC sold a portion of them to local arms dealers, often to raise cash to pay additional fighters. Some MOC-supplied weapons were sold to Bedouin traders referred to locally as "The Birds" in Lajat, a volcanic plateau northeast of Daraa, Syria. According to rebel forces, the Bedouins would then trade the weapons to ISIL, who would place orders using the encrypted WhatsApp messaging service. Two rebel commanders and a United Kingdom weapons monitoring organization maintain that MOC–supplied weapons have made their way to ISIL forces.

A 2017 study conducted by Conflict Armament Research at the behest of the European Union and Deutsche Gesellschaft für Internationale Zusammenarbeit does not mention Timber Sycamore but found that external support for anti-Assad Syrian rebels "significantly augmented the quantity and quality of weapons available to [ISIL] forces," including, in the most rapid case diversion they documented, "anti-tank weapons purchased by the United States that ended up in possession of the Islamic State within two months of leaving the factory." The study traced the provenance of some weapons in detail. However, the study found no instance in which US arms supplied to the Kurdish– and Arab–led Syrian Democratic Forces (SDF) to fight ISIL ended up in ISIL's arsenal.

Phasing out
In July 2017, anonymous officials stated that President Donald Trump, in consultation with National Security Adviser H. R. McMaster and CIA Director Mike Pompeo, had decided to phase out support for anti-Assad Syrian rebel forces, possibly redirecting resources to fighting ISIL, to offering rebel forces defensive capabilities, or to other operations in the region.

The officials said that the decision was made prior to Trump's participation in the G-20 summit and 7 July meeting with Russian president Vladimir Putin. Several officials characterized the decision as a "major concession" to Russia, with one remarking: "Putin won in Syria." However, another official stated that ending the program was not a major concession due to Assad's recent victories in the Syrian Civil War, but rather "a signal to Putin that the administration wants to improve ties to Russia." Some members of the Obama administration reportedly had wished to scrap the program because some rebels armed and trained by the program had joined ISIL and related groups.

A related US military program to arm, train, and support the SDF fighting ISIL with airstrikes continued in 2017 through the years 2018 and 2019 into the present.

Commentary

Press 
Andrea Barrile wrote in 2016 in International Business Times of Italy that corrupt Jordanian intelligence officials facilitated weapons trafficking that supported the Iraqi insurgency after the US-led 2003 invasion of Iraq. For this reason, according to the paper, the Obama administration was reluctant to approve Timber Sycamore and debated a year before doing so.

In Il Giornale, Fausto Biloslavo has reported that despite the program's secrecy, US Vice President Joe Biden was photographed at the center of Zarqa in March 2015.

In April 2014, Seymour Hersh wrote an essay published in the London Review of Books which does not mention Timber Sycamore but which describes an anonymous former senior US intelligence official's claims that the U.S. diplomatic post in Libya's Benghazi "had no real political role" and existed solely to provide cover for a secret arms pipeline supporting Syrian rebels fighting in the Syrian Civil War in early 2012. According to Hersh's source, the "rat line" was a means for channeling military weapons from Gaddafi's arsenals into Syria and into the hands of Syrian rebels. According to Hersh, an agreement in early 2012 between Obama and Erdoğan proposed an operation funded by Turkey, Saudi Arabia and Qatar, and conducted by the CIA in collaboration with MI6, although a spokesperson for then CIA director David Petraeus said the operation never happened.

Politicians 
In 2016, US Senator Ron Wyden's office questioned the program, releasing a statement that "the US is trying to build up the battlefield capabilities of the anti-Assad opposition, but they haven't provided the public with details about how this is being done, which US agencies are involved, or which foreign partners those agencies are working with."

Analysts 
Thomas Joscelyn of The Weekly Standard defended Trump administration's decision to cancel the program, arguing "there is no evidence that any truly moderate force is effectively fighting Assad." In December 2017, Max Abrahms of the Council on Foreign Relations and John Glaser of the Cato Institute observed in the Los Angeles Times that "[ISIL] imploded right after external support for the 'moderate' rebels dried up," which is consistent with studies demonstrating that "external support for the opposition tends to exacerbate and extend civil wars, which usually peter out not through power-sharing agreements among fighting equals, but when one side—typically, the incumbent—achieves dominance." Political scientist Federico Manfredi Firmian called Timber Sycamore “one of the United States’ most ill-conceived and deadly covert-action programmes,” noting that it failed to unseat Assad, fuelled the war, and inflicted untold misery on the Syrian people.

Columnists
In 2016, Canadian conservative commentator Rachel Marsden, in a column in The Baltimore Sun, gave her interpretation of the New York Times reporting on Timber Sycamore as the CIA and Saudi Arabia intending for Timber Sycamore to allow independent military forces to drive out Assad, install a Syrian leader friendly to US, Saudi and Qatari interests, and weaken Russia's influence in the Middle East.
In 2016, Australian columnist Paul Malone speculated in the Sydney Morning Herald that weapons delivered by Timber Sycamore might be acquired by al-Qaeda in Syria, comparing the program to CIA support for the Afghan mujahideen, or American weaponry being seized by ISIL in 2014 in Mosul, Iraq.

See also 
 American-led intervention in the Syrian Civil War
 Operation Cyclone, 1979–1992 CIA program to arm and finance Islamist insurgents fighting the Soviet-sponsored government of Afghanistan.
 Iran–Contra affair, US arms sales to Iran to support Contras.
 Safari Club, anti-communist Middle East clandestine operations group during the Cold War.
 Foreign interventions by the United States
 United States involvement in regime change
 2015 Amman shooting attack
 King Faisal Air Base shooting
 Stop Arming Terrorists Act
 Collaboration with ISIL

References 

Central Intelligence Agency operations
Foreign policy of the Barack Obama administration
Operations involving American special forces
Military operations of the Syrian civil war involving the United States